Frank Patrick "Dick" Devlin (November 10, 1884 in New York, New York – January 6, 1938 in Bronx, New York) was an American track and field athlete who competed in the 1904 Summer Olympics in the marathon. He finished twelfth of the fifteen finishers, but moved up to eleventh after Frederick Lorz was disqualified.

See also 
 United States at the 1904 Summer Olympics

References

External links
 

American male marathon runners
Olympic track and field athletes of the United States
Athletes (track and field) at the 1904 Summer Olympics
1884 births
1938 deaths
American plumbers
Track and field athletes from New York City